Ivakino is a rural locality (a village) in Pogorelovskoye Rural Settlement, Totemsky  District, Vologda Oblast, Russia. The population was 33 as of 2002.

Geography 
Ivakino is located 57 km southwest of Totma (the district's administrative centre) by road. Pogorelovo is the nearest rural locality.

References 

Rural localities in Totemsky District